George F. Vande Woude (December 25, 1935 – April 13, 2021) was a scientist and former director at Van Andel Research Institute in Michigan studying breast cancer.

Early life 
George Vande Woude was born on December 25, 1935, in New York City to George and Alice (Leudesdorff) Vande Woude.  He was married to the former Dorothy Stapel for over 57 years until her death in 2016.

Education 
Vande Woude graduated from Rutgers University with an MS and PhD in 1962 and 1964, respectively. While at Rutgers, he trained with Dr. Frank F. Davis. He was a postdoctoral fellow at the USDA Plum Island Animal Disease Center from 1964 to 1972.

Career 
He joined the National Cancer Institute in 1972 and was a member for 28 years.

In 1983, he took the lead at NCI's Frederick National Laboratory for Cancer Research for 15 years. He was Director of Basic Sciences at NCI when he was recruited to lead the new VARI. In 1998, he became the first director of Van Andel Research Institute and served until 2009. He was a Fellow at VARI. He recruited several young scientists to VARI who have developed successful careers, including Bart Williams from the NCI laboratory of former National Institutes of Health director Harold Varmus, Cindy Miranti from the Harvard laboratory of Joan Brugge.

In 1984, Vande Woude discovered the oncogene MET, which is mutated in many cancers, and characterized it as a receptor tyrosine kinase. MET is now the target of many cancer drugs in development. His laboratory also discovered the MOS oncogene. In total, he has been a co-author on 297 PubMed referenced publications during his career.

Awards 
 2013 - Elected Fellow of the AACR Academy
 2009 - Distinguished Scientific Fellow, Van Andel Research Institute
 2006–20?? Chair, Council of Scientific Advisors, American Association for Cancer Research
 2006 - Elected Fellow of the American Academy of Arts and Sciences
 2001-2004 - Member of the Board of Directors, American Association for Cancer Research
 1997 - Elected Member of the American Academy of Microbiology
 1993 - Elected Member of the National Academy of Sciences
 1992 - Lifetime Achievement Award in Technology Transfer, National Aeronautics and Space Administration
 1989 - Robert J. and Claire Pasarow Foundation Award for Cancer Research
 1985 - Founder and President, Foundation for Advanced Cancer Studies
 1983-1998 - Director of the ABL-Basic Research Program, National Cancer Institute
 1982 - National Institutes of Health MERIT Award

References 

1935 births
2021 deaths
American medical researchers
Rutgers University alumni
Cancer researchers
People from New York City
Members of the United States National Academy of Sciences